B. E. Taylor Christmas 2 is the third album by solo artist B. E. Taylor. It was released in 2000, and is the continuation of B.E.'s first album, B. E. Taylor Christmas. The album features 10 renditions of popular Christmas songs and 3 original songs.

Track listing
"I Saw Three Ships" – 5:38
"Feel the Love of Christmas" – 4:23
"Mary, Did You Know?" – 4:02
"Hark The Herald Angels Sing" – 6:05
"Let There Be Peace On Earth" – 6:19
"The First Noel" – 6:11
"Away In The Manger/Do You Hear What I Hear?" – 5:49
"Sweet Little Jesus Baby/Go Tell It On The Mountain" – 4:23
"Feel The Love Of Christmas" (acoustic) – 4:23
"Light Of The Stable" – 4:18
"I Will Remember" – 4:45

2000 Christmas albums
Christmas albums by American artists
B. E. Taylor albums
Pop rock Christmas albums